József Fogl, also known as József Fogoly, József Újpesti and Fogl III (14 August 1897 – 6 February 1971) was a Hungarian footballer who played for Újpest FC, as well as representing the Hungarian national football team.

Fogl was born in Újpest, Austria-Hungary. Between 1920 and 1930 he played 37 games for the Hungarian national team as a left defender. Together with his older brother, Károly Fogl II, the two Fogls formed the legendary "Fogl-gate" (Fogl-gát in Hungarian), an extremely powerful and tough defending formation for more than a decade.

Fogl III won the 1929 Mitropa Cup and the 1930 Coupe des Nations as well as the 1929–30 and 1930–31 season with Újpest, being the captain of the team on all occasions. He died in Budapest on 6 February 1971.

References

Hungarian footballers
Hungary international footballers
People from Újpest
Újpest FC players
1897 births
1971 deaths
Association football fullbacks
Footballers at the 1924 Summer Olympics
Olympic footballers of Hungary